Oliver Brady is a former Gaelic footballer who played for the Cavan county team.

Playing career
Brady was a Half-Back who liked to attack from defence. He won an All-Star Award in 1978 making him Cavan's first All Star.

References

Year of birth missing (living people)
Living people
Cavan inter-county Gaelic footballers
Redhills Gaelic footballers